The Circuito de Basquetbol del Noreste, "CIBANE" was a professional basketball league in Northeastern Mexico. CIBANE was founded in 2010 with 6 teams. The main purpose of this league is to give Mexican players the opportunity to showcase their talents, while maintaining a high level of basketball. After low funds forced league officials to cancel the 2014 season, the league was indefinitely suspended in December of that year.

Rules
There are some specific rules to ensure that Mexican players have the opportunity to play, like allowing only two non-Mexican born players per team. Some other rules are having a trade deadline so the league stays competitive until the end of the season, finally, the CIBANE league has applied a hard salary cap to maintain fair rosters and promote the use of young local players.

Current Teams
 Mineros de Fresnillo  (Fresnillo, Zacatecas)
 Tuzos UAZ Cemozac (Zacatecas, Zacatecas)
 Guerreros de Apodaca (Apodaca, Nuevo León)
 Cuervos de Pabellón de Arteaga (Pabellón de Arteaga, Aguascalientes)

Former Teams 
 Acereros de Monclova (Monclova, Coahuila)
 Águilas de Piedras Negras (Piedras Negras, Coahuila)
 Caktus de Saltillo (Saltillo, Coahuila)
 Marqueteros de Linares (relocated to Apodaca, Nuevo León)

League Champions

Award Winners
Awards were given according to basketball specialized website eurobasket.com

Notes

Related links/Sources
Official League Site

Basketball leagues in Mexico
Bas
2010 establishments in Mexico